Maria Ivanov is a Romanian sprint canoer who competed in the early 1970s. She won a bronze medal in the K-4 500 m event at the 1973 ICF Canoe Sprint World Championships in Tampere.

References

Living people
Romanian female canoeists
Year of birth missing (living people)
ICF Canoe Sprint World Championships medalists in kayak